Hagley Road railway station was a railway station in Birmingham, England, built by the Harborne Railway and operated by the London and North Western Railway in 1874. In addition to the passenger facilities, there was also a goods yard and a coal wharf.

It served part of the Edgbaston area of Birmingham and was located between Hagley Road and Station Avenue.

The station closed to passenger traffic in 1934, though it was open to goods traffic until 1963.

There is little evidence of the station on the ground today. The trackbed through the station is now part of the Harborne Nature Walk.

References

British History Online

Disused railway stations in Birmingham, West Midlands
Railway stations in Great Britain opened in 1874
Railway stations in Great Britain closed in 1934
Former London and North Western Railway stations